In mathematics, triangulation describes the replacement of topological spaces by piecewise linear spaces, i.e. the choice of a homeomorphism in a suitable simplicial complex. Spaces being homeomorphic to a simplicial complex are called triangulable. Triangulation has various uses in different branches of mathematics, for instance in algebraic topology, in complex analysis or in modeling.

Motivation 
On the one hand, it is sometimes useful to forget about superfluous information of topological spaces: The replacement of the original spaces with simplicial complexes may help to recognize crucial properties and to gain a better understanding of the considered object.

On the other hand, simplicial complexes are objects of combinatorial character and therefore one can assign them quantities rising from their combinatorial pattern, for instance, the Euler characteristic. Triangulation allows now to assign such quantities to topological spaces.

Investigations concerning the existence and uniqueness of triangulations established a new branch in topology, namely the piecewise-linear-topology (short PL- topology). Its main purpose is topological properties of simplicial complexes and its generalization, cell-complexes.

Simplicial complexes

Abstract simplicial complexes 
An abstract simplicial complex above a set  is a system  of non-empty subsets such that:

  for each 

A simplex with  has dimension  by definition.

Abstract simplicial complexes can be thought of as geometrical objects too. This requires the term of geometric simplex.

Geometric simplices 
It has dimension  by definition.

The -dimensional standard-simplex is the simplex spanned by the unit vectors

Geometric simplicial complexes 
A geometric simplicial complex  is a union of geometric simplices such that

The set  can be realized as a topological space  by choosing the closed sets to be  is closed for all . In the case that each point in the complex lies only in finetly many simplices, both topologies coincide

A natural question is if vice versa, any abstract simplicial complex corresponds to a geometric complex. In general, the geometric construction as mentioned here is not flexible enough: Consider for instance abstract simplicial complex of infinite dimension. However, the following more abstract construction provides a topological space for any kind of abstract simplicial complex:

Let  be an abstract simplicial complex above a set .

As in the previous construction, by the topology induced by gluing, the closed sets in this space are the subsets being closed in the subspace topology of each simplex .

A natural neighborhood of a vertex  of a simplicial complex  is considered to be the star  of a simplex, its boundary is the link

.

Simplicial maps 
The maps considered in this category are simplicial maps: Let ,  be abstract simplicial complexes above sets , . By affine-linear extension on the simplices,  induces a map between the geometric realizations of the complexes.

Examples 
 Let  and let . The associated geometric complex is a star with center .
 Let  and let . Its geometric realization  is a tetrahedron.
 Let  as above and let . The geometric simplicial complex is the boundary of a tetrahedron .

Definition 
A triangulation of a topological space  is a homeomorphism  where  is a simplicial complex. Topological spaces do not necessarily admit a triangulation and if they do, it is not necessarily unique.

Examples 

 Simplicial complexes can be triangulated by identity.
 Let  be as in the examples seen above. The closed unit ball  is homeomorphic to a tetrahedron so it admits a triangulation, namely the homeomorphism . Restricting  to  yields a homeomorphism .

 The torus  admits a triangulation. To see this, consider the torus as a square where the parallel faces are glued together. This square can be triangulated as shown below:

 The projective plane  admits a triangulation (see CW-complexes)
 One can show that differentiable manifolds admit triangulations.

Invariants 
Triangulations of spaces allow assigning combinatorial invariants rising from their dedicated simplicial complexes to spaces. These are characteristics that equal for complexes that are isomorphic via a simplicial map and thus have the same combinatorial pattern.

This data might be useful to classify topological spaces up to homeomorphism but only given that the characteristics are also topological invariants, meaning, they do not depend on the chosen triangulation. For the data listed here, this is the case. For details and the link to singular homology, see topological invariance

Homology 
Via triangulation, one can assign a chain complex to topological spaces that arise from its simplicial complex and compute its simplicial homology. Compact spaces always admit finite triangulations and therefore their homology groups are finitely generated and only finitely many of them do not vanish. Other data as Betti- Numbers or Euler characteristic can be derived from homology.

Betti- numbers and Euler-characteristics 
Let  be a finite simplicial complex. The - th Betti- number  is defined to be the rank of the - th simplicial homology- group of the spaces. These numbers encode geometric properties of the spaces: The Betti- Number  for instance represents the number of connected components. For a triangulated, closed orientable surfaces ,  holds where  denotes the genus of the surface: Therefore its first Betti- number represents the doubled number of handles of the surface.

With the comments above, for compact spaces all Betti- numbers are finite and almost all are zero. Therefore, one can form their alternating sum

which is called the Euler Charakteristik of the complex, a catchy topological invariant.

Topological invariance 
To use these invariants for the classification of topological spaces up to homeomorphism one needs invariance of the characteristics regarding homeomorphism.

A famous approach to the question was at the beginning of the 20th century the attempt to show that any two triangulations of the same topological space admit a common subdivision. This assumption is known as Hauptvermutung ( German: Main assumption). Let   be a simplicial complex. A complex  is said to be a subdivision of  iff:

Those conditions ensure that subdivisions does not change the simplicial complex as a set or as a topological space. Two complexes that correspond to another via piecewise linear bijection are said to be combinatorial isomorphic. In particular, two complexes that have a common refinement are combinatorially equivalent. Homology groups are invariant to combinatorial equivalence and therefore the Hauptvermutung would give the topological invariance of simplicial homology groups. In 1918, Alexander introduced the concept of singular homology. Henceforth, most of the invariants arising from triangulation were replaced by invariants arising from singular homology. For those new invariants, it can be shown that they were invariant regarding homeomorphism and even regarding homotopy equivalence. Furthermore it was shown that singular and simplicial homology groups coincide. This workaround has shown the invariance of the data to homeomorphism. Hauptvermutung lost in importance but it was initial for a new branch in topology: The piecewise linear (short PL- topology) topology examines topological properties of topological spaces.

Hauptvermutung 
The Hauptvermutung (German for main conjecture) states that two triangulations always admit a common subdivision. Originally, its purpose was to prove invariance of combinatorial invariants regarding homeomorphisms. The assumption that such subdivisions exist in general is intuitive, as subdivision are easy to construct for simple spaces, for instance for low dimensional manifolds. Indeed the assumption was proven for manifolds of dimension  and for differentiable manifolds but it was disproved in general:  An important tool to show that triangulations do not admit a common subdivision. i. e their underlying complexes are not combinatorially isomorphic is the combinatorial invariant of Reidemeister Torsion.

Reidemeister-Torsion 
To disprove the Hauptvermutung it is helpful to use combinatorial invariants which are not topological invariants. A famous example is Reidemeister-Torsion. It can be assigned to a tuple  of CW- complexes: If  this characteristic will be a topological invariant but if  in general not. An approach to Hauptvermutung was to find homeomorphic spaces with different values of Reidemeister-Torsion. This invariant was used initially to classify lens- spaces and first counterexamples to the Hauptvermutung were built based on lens- spaces:

Classification of lens- spaces 
In its original formulation, Lens spaces are 3-manifolds, constructed as quotient spaces of the 3-sphere: Let  be natural numbers, such that   are coprime . The lens space  is defined to be the orbit space of the free group action

.

For different tuples , Lens spaces will be homotopy- equivalent but not homeomorphic.  Therefore they can't be distinguished with the help of classical invariants as the fundamental group but by the use of Reidemeister-Torsion.

Two Lens spaces are homeomorphic, if and only if . This is the case iff two Lens spaces are simple-homotopy-equivalent. The fact can be used to construct counterexamples for the Hauptvermutung as follows. Suppose there are spaces  derived from non-homeomorphic Lens spaces having different Reidemeister torsion. The resulting spaces will disprove the Hauptvermutung.

Existence of triangulation 
Besides the question of concrete triangulations for computational issues, there are statements about spaces that are easier to prove given that they are simplicial complexes. Especially manifolds are of interest. Topological manifolds of dimension  are always triangulable but there are non-triangulable manifolds for dimension , for  arbitrary but greater than three. Further, differentiable manifolds always admit triangulations.

PL- Structures 
Manifolds are an important class of spaces. It is natural to require them not only to be triangulable but moreover to admit a piecewise linear atlas, a PL- structure:

An important lemma is the following:

Let  be a topological space. It is equivalent

  is an -dimensional manifold and admits a PL- structure.
 There is a triangulation of  such that the link of each vertex is an   sphere.
 For each triangulation of  the link of each vertex is an  sphere.
The equivalence of the second and the third statement is because that the link of a vertex is independent of the chosen triangulation up to combinatorial isomorphism. One can show that differentiable manifolds admit a PL- structure as well as manifolds of dimension . Counterexamples for the triangulation conjecture are counterexamples for the conjecture of the existence of PL- structure of course.

Moreover, there are examples for triangulated spaces which do not admit a PL- structure. Consider an - dimensional PL- Homology-sphere . The double suspension  is a topological -sphere. Choosing a triangulation  obtained via the suspension operation on triangulations the resulting simplicial complex is not a PL- manifold, because there is a vertex  such that  is not a  sphere.

A question arising with the definition is if PL-structures are always unique: Given two PL- structures for the same space , is there a there a homeomorphism  which is piecewise linear with respect to both PL- structures? The assumption is similar to the Hauptvermutung and indeed there are spaces which have different PL-structures which are not equivalent. Triangulation of PL- equivalent spaces can be transformed into one another via Pachner moves:

Pachner Moves 

Pachner moves are a way to manipulate triangulations: Let  be a simplicial complex. For two simplices  the Join

This replacement is called a Pachner move. The theorem of Pachner states that whenever two triangulated manifolds are PL- equivalent, there is a series of Pachner moves transforming both into another.

CW-complexes 

A similar but more flexible construction than simplicial complexes is the one of CW-complexes. Its construction is as follows:

An - cell is the closed - dimensional unit-ball , an open -cell is its inner . Let  be a topological space, let  be a continuous map. The gluing  is said to be obtained by gluing on an -cell.

A cell complex is a union  of topological spaces such that

  is a discrete set

Each simplicial complex is a CW-complex, the inverse is not true. The construction of CW- complexes can be used to define cellular homology and one can show that cellular homology and simplicial homology coincide. For computational issues, it is sometimes easier to assume spaces to be CW- complexes and determine their homology via cellular decomposition, an example is the projective plane : Its construction as a CW-complex needs three cells, whereas its simplicial complex consists of 54 simplices.

Other Applications

Classification of manifolds 
By triangulating 1-dimensional manifolds, one can show that they are always homeomorphic to disjoint copies of the real line and the unit sphere . Moreover, surfaces, i.e. 2-manifolds, can be classified completely: Let  be a compact surface.

To prove this theorem one constructs a fundamental polygon of the surface: This can be done by using the simplicial structure obtained by the triangulation.

Maps on simplicial complexes 
Giving spaces the structure of a simplicial structure might help to understand maps defined on the spaces. The maps can often be assumed to be simplicial maps via the simplicial approximation theorem:

Simplicial approximation 
Let ,  be abstract simplicial complexes above sets , . By affin-linear extension on the simplices,  induces a map between the geometric realizations of the complexes. Each point in a geometric complex lies in the inner of exactly one simplex, its support. Consider now a continuous map . If such an approximation exists, one can construct a homotopy  transforming  into  by defining it on each simplex; there it always exists, because simplices are contractible.

The theorem plays an important role for certain statements in algebraic topology in order to reduce the behavior of continuous maps on those of simplicial maps, for instance in Lefschetz's fixed-point theorem.

Lefschetz's fixed-point theorem 
The Lefschetz number is a useful tool to find out whether a continuous function admits fixed-points. A continuous map  induces homomorphisms  between its simplicial homology groups with coefficients in a field . These are linear maps between - vectorspaces, so their trace  can be determined and their alternating sum

The fixpoint theorem states that whenever ,  has a fixed-point. In the proof this is first shown only for simplicial maps and then generalized for any continuous functions via the approximation theorem. Brouwer's fixpoint theorem treats the case where  is an endomorphism of the unit-ball.

Formula of Riemann-Hurwitz 
The Riemann- Hurwitz formula allows to determine the gender of a compact, connected Riemann surface  without using explicit triangulation. The proof needs the existence of triangulations for surfaces in an abstract sense: Let  be a non-constant holomorphic function on a surface with known gender.

where  denotes the degree of the map. The sum is well defined as it counts only the ramifying points of the function.

The background of this formula is that holomorphic functions on Riemann surfaces are ramified coverings. The formula can be found by examining the image of the simplicial structure near to ramifiying points.

Citations

Literature 

Allen Hatcher: Algebraic Topology, Cambridge University Press, Cambridge/New York/Melbourne 2006, ISBN 0-521-79160-X
James R. Munkres: . Band 1984. Addison Wesley, Menlo Park, California 1984, ISBN 0-201-04586-9
Marshall M. Cohen: A course in Simple-Homotopy Theory . In: Graduate Texts in Mathematics. 1973, ISSN 0072-5285, doi:10.1007/978-1-4684-9372-6.

Topology
Algebraic topology
Geometric topology
Structures on manifolds
Triangulation (geometry)